Erik Tegner (29 October 1896 – 9 September 1965) was a Danish male tennis player. He competed in the singles event at the 1920 Summer Olympics and 1924 Summer Olympics, reaching the second round on both occasions. With compatriot Amory Hansen he reached the final of the mixed doubles event in 1920 in which they lost to eventual Olympic champions Suzanne Lenglen and Max Decugis. In the bronze medal match they lost to Milada Skrbková and Ladislav Žemla-Rázný.

References

1896 births
1965 deaths
Danish male tennis players
Olympic tennis players of Denmark
Tennis players at the 1920 Summer Olympics
Tennis players at the 1924 Summer Olympics
Erik Tegner
20th-century Danish people